Colias hyperborea is a butterfly in the family Pieridae. It is found in the East Palearctic.

Description
Colias hyperborea is golden red or golden yellow above in the male, having rarely a bluish gloss; costal margin of forewing and inner margin of hindwing sulphur yellow, distal margin of forewing broadly blackish brown, dusted with sulphur yellow, the "sex-mark" at the costal margin of the hindwing large, elongate, reddish, the black middle spot of the forewing elongate, often large, the middle spot of the hindwing large, golden red, fringes of forewing rosy red, of hindwing often sulphur yellow. Underside of forewing light golden red, paler at the inner margin, greenish sulphur yellow at the costal and distal margins, very little dusted with black, hindwing greenish, the silvery middle spot thinly edged with red brown. The female is darkened above by greenish or blackish scaling, the distal marginal band bearing seven sulphur-yellow or yellow spots; hindwing darkened, the distal marginal band with large sulphur or golden-yellow spots, which often form a band; fringe and costa of forewing rosy red. The underside of the hindwing yellowish greenish, the veins being bluish, the middle spot silvery, small, and thinly edged with red brown.

Biology
The larva feeds on Astragalus alpinus and Oxytropis czukotica. It flies in June and July.

Subspecies
C. h. hyperborea northeastern Siberia, Chukot Peninsula
C. h. kurnakovi Kurentzov, 1970 Magadan
C. h. tunkuna Austaut, 1912 Sayan
C. h. puella Churkin & Grieshuber, 2001 eastern Chukotka
C. h. paradoxa Churkin & Grieshuber, 2001 Putorana plateau

Taxonomy
It is accepted as a species by Josef Grieshuber and Gerardo Lamas.

References

External links
Rusinsects
State Darwin Museum images type specimen images of Colias hyperborea paradoxa Churkin et Greishuber, 2001 and Colias hyperborea puella Churkin and Greishuber, 2001; Churkin, Greishuber, Bogdanov, and Zamolodchikov, 2001 at the Darwin Museum

Butterflies described in 1899
hyperborea
Taxa named by Grigory Grum-Grshimailo